Mudeungsan is a mountain in South Korea. It extends over the district of Buk-gu in the city of Gwangju, as well as Hwasun County and Damyang County in the province of Jeollanam-do. The peak of Mudeungsan is named Cheonwang summit, but it has been designated as a protection zone for air force military installations.

Looking from the summit, Hallasan in Jeju Island and Geojedo in Namhae, Gyeongsangnam-do can be seen.

Name

The mountain was known as Muak or Mujinak due to its location Mujinju, the former name of Gwangju. As most of the big mountain ranges are related to shamanism, it was also called "the Grave Mountain" or "the Shaman Mountain". The Mudeungsan range is primarily composed of soil rather than rocks. It was called Seoseok mountain during the Goryeo dynasty. It was after the introduction to Buddhism in Korea that it was called Mudeungsan. One explanation for this is that the people believed that the greatness of the mountain could not be compared to anything on the land, and thus it could not ("mu") be graded ("deung"). However, this is supposedly an interpretation adapted from the Hanja transliteration of its original Korean name, which comes from Gwangju's original name, Moodeul or Moodol. The jin in Mujin as written in Hanja was not pronounced so in the past. It used to be read as deul or dol in Korean. Therefore Mudeung can be interpreted in the same way.

History
On 22 May 1972, Mudeungsan was designated as a provincial park. On 29 April 1974, the government notified a basic park plan (the 61st notification of Jeollanamdo). On 1 September 1987, the government installed the Mudeungsan Park Administrative Office. On 24 September 1998, the government established a comprehensive plan about conservation and use of Mudeungsan. On 7 December 2001, the government changed the basic park plan. On 24 December 2010, the city of Gwangju filed a petition to the minister of environment to designate Mudeungsan as a national park. On 31 December 2012, Mudeungsan was designated as a national park. On 4 March 2013, the government installed Mudeungsan national park office and east office. On 3 December 2015, the government notified withdrawal of military bases.

Provincial and national park
Mudeungsan was designated as a provincial park in 1972. It is located at the city of Gwangju, Hwasun County and Damyang County. However, Gwangju Lake area and some cultural areas were excluded from national park, due to the opposition from local government and residents.

Natural monument
Columnar joining in the mountain is protected as natural monument  465.

There are many valuable animals such as otters, wildcats, buzzards and Mandarin ducks, designated as endangered at Mudeungsan. In addition, there are many cultural heritages.

Summits
In 2011, after 45 years of being restricted by the military, Inwang summit and Jiwang summit were opened to the public. However, Cheongwang summit remained closed due to air defense facilities. Only those identified and approved by the military after learning about security-related subjects from Jangbuljae can go there. It was opened twice in 2011; quarterly in 2012 and 2013; once in 2014; and three times in 2015.

Environment
The Sobaek Mountains are the main range of Mudeungsan. Mudeungsan has a gradual descent toward the ground. The sky is clear 53 days per year.

Tourist attractions

 Soswaewon Garden
 Songgangjeong Pavilion
 Myeonangjeong Pavilion
 Sigyeongjeong Pavilion
 Hwanbyeokdang Pavilion
 Riverside Eco Park
 Unjusa Temple
 Ssangbongsa Temple
 Gokseong Train Village
 Boseong Green Tea Farm
 Chuwolsan Mountain
 Damyang Bamboo Garden
 Hwasun Hot Springs
 Dogok Hot Springs

See also
List of mountains in Korea
National parks of South Korea
Jeungsimsa temple
Wonhyosa temple

References

Further reading
박선홍, 《무등산》(전남매일출판국, 1976)

Mountains of Gwangju
Mountains of South Jeolla Province
Buk District, Gwangju
Dong District, Gwangju
Damyang County
Hwasun County
One-thousanders of South Korea